Odd Roar Lofterød (8 April 1947 – 14 September 2012) is a Norwegian sailor. He was born in Oslo, and was a brother of Bjørn Lofterød. 

He competed at the 1972 Summer Olympics in Munich.

His father, Odd Roar Lofterød senior, established the Swiss company Odlo in 1946.

References

External links

1947 births
2012 deaths
Sportspeople from Oslo
Olympic sailors of Norway
Norwegian male sailors (sport)
Sailors at the 1968 Summer Olympics – Flying Dutchman
Sailors at the 1972 Summer Olympics – Star
Soling class sailors